Mariquita Gallegos (born 1940) is an Argentine singer and actress. She was married to the Uruguayan actor Juan Carlos Mareco.

Selected filmography
 El Asalto (1960)
 La Chacota (1962)
 Would You Marry Me? (1967)
 Los caballeros de la cama redonda (1973)

References

Bibliography
 Peter Cowie & Derek Elley. World Filmography: 1967. Fairleigh Dickinson University Press, 1977.

External links

1940 births
Living people
Actresses from Buenos Aires
Argentine film actresses
20th-century Argentine actresses